Geotrichum klebahnii is a plant pathogen fungus.

References

External links

Saccharomycetes
Fungal plant pathogens and diseases